Adhesive tape is one of many varieties of backing materials coated with an adhesive. Several types of adhesives can be used.

Types
 Pressure-sensitive tape

Pressure-sensitive tape, PSA tape, self-stick tape or sticky tape consists of a pressure sensitive adhesive coated onto a backing material such as paper, plastic film, cloth, or metal foil. It is sticky (tacky) without any heat or solvent for activation and adheres to surfaces with light pressure.  Typical adhesives are polymers such as acrylates, natural, and synthetic rubber. These tapes usually require a release agent on their backing or a release liner to cover the adhesive.  Sometimes, the term "adhesive tape" is used for these tapes.

 Water-activated tape
Water-activated tape, gummed paper tape or gummed tape is starch- or sometimes animal glue-based adhesive on a paper backing which becomes sticky when moistened.

A specific type of gummed tape is called reinforced gummed tape (RGT). The backing of this reinforced tape consists of two layers of paper with a cross-pattern of fiberglass filaments laminated between. The laminating adhesive had previously been asphalt but now is more commonly a hot-melt atactic polypropylene.

Gummed tapes are described in ASTM D5749-01(2006) Standard Specification for Reinforced and Plain gummed Tape for Sealing and Securing.

Water-activated tape is used for closing and sealing boxes. Before closing corrugated fiberboard boxes, the tape is wetted or remoistened, activated by water. The tape is mostly 3 inch or 7,5 cm wide.

 Heat-sensitive tape
Heat-activated tape is usually tack-free until it is activated by a heat source. It is sometimes used in packaging, for example, a tear strip tape for cigarette packs. Conversely, thermal release tape, such as REVALPHA by Nitto Denko, loses its tack and fully releases when heated to a certain temperature. This is particularly useful in the semiconductor industry.

 Drywall tape
Drywall tape is paper, cloth, or mesh, sometimes with a gummed or PSA adhesive. It is used to make the joints between sheets of drywall materials.

See also
Tape dispenser
Duct tape

References

External links